Edouardia may refer to:
 Edouardia, a genus of plants in the family Bignoniaceae, synonym of Dolichandra
 Edouardia, a genus of gastropods in the family Cerastidae, synonym of Conulinus